Leon Hilton Gillis (November 11, 1920 – October 31, 2010) was an American traveler. In 1961-62, Leon Gillis of Virginia led his family of eight on a coast-to-coast covered wagon journey, in the "Last Wagon West."  In 1963-64, the Gillis family took their wagon to Europe, traveling from France, to a Dutch visit with Freddy Heineken, through Minsk to Moscow, living by dint of their wits and the generosity of strangers.  These journeys were covered in various local media as well as Newsweek, Life magazine, Soviet Life, the Nieuwe Rotterdamsche Courant, and on network television from prime time news to The Ed Sullivan Show, the Today Show, and the television program To Tell the Truth, and Soviet film Beloved (Любимая).

References 

People from Virginia

1920 births
2010 deaths
Travelers
Carriage drivers